Andreyevskaya is a rural locality (a village) in Cherevkovskoye Rural Settlement of Krasnoborsky District, Arkhangelsk Oblast, Russia. The population was 111 as of 2010.

Geography 
Andreyevskaya is located 35 km northwest of Krasnoborsk (the district's administrative centre) by road. Verkhnyaya Sergiyevskaya is the nearest rural locality.

References 

Rural localities in Krasnoborsky District